Wolframmeyia imperialis is a species of moth of the family Erebidae. The scientific name of this species was first published in 1910 by Karl Grünberg. It is found in the Democratic Republic of the Congo.

References

Erebidae
Moths of Africa
Moths described in 1910
Endemic fauna of the Democratic Republic of the Congo